Our Curse (original title Nasza klątwa) is a 2013 Polish documentary film by Tomasz Śliwiński documenting the first six  months in their life of his son Leo, who suffers from the rare genetic disorder called Ondine's curse. When Leo was born, a friend of Śliwiński's had suggested he document his experiences as a form of therapy. Śliwiński was in film school at the time; his wife Magda Hueckel is a professional photographer. Our Curse was nominated for the Academy Award for Best Documentary (Short Subject) at the 87th Academy Awards, along with another Polish film in the same category, Joanna.

Awards and nominations

References

External links
 
 

2013 films
2013 short documentary films
Documentary films about families
Documentary films about children with disability
Autobiographical documentary films
Polish short documentary films